The Cathedral of St. Mary, Queen of the Holy Rosary (Sinhala: Galla Santha Mariya Asana Dewu Mædura), is the cathedral church of the Roman Catholic Diocese of Galle.  It is a landmark in the city of Galle, Sri Lanka.  The cathedral was built by the Society of Jesus at the end of the 19th century.  The first bishop was the Belgian Jesuit .

The Cathedral is central and important to the Catholics of southern Sri Lanka in the Diocese of Galle.  The church is dedicated to the Blessed Virgin Mary.

References

External links 

 
 Diocese of Galle

Archaeological protected monuments in Galle District
Churches in Galle
Roman Catholic cathedrals in Sri Lanka
Tourist attractions in Southern Province, Sri Lanka
19th-century Roman Catholic church buildings in Sri Lanka